"Kom" (English: Come) is a  song by the Swedish Europop group Timoteij. It was recorded in 2009 and was written by Niclas Arn, Karl Eurén and Gustav Eurén as the leading single for the group's debut album Längtan.

Timoteij participated in the Swedish Melodifestivalen 2010 with "Kom" and finished first in the third semi-final in Gothenburg and therefore progressed to the finale in the Globe Arena in Stockholm. The song finished at fifth place with a total of 95 points. It was eventually chosen to represent Sweden at the OGAE Second Chance Contest and finished at first place.

Track listing

Digital Download
(Released: February 28, 2010) (Universal)
"Kom" [Radio Edit] — 3:00

CD-single
(Released: March, 2010) (Universal)
"Kom" [Radio Edit] — 3:00
"Kom" [Instrumental] — 3:00

Digital Download
(Released: March 6, 2011) (Universal)
"Run" [English version] — 3:00

Charts

Weekly charts

Year-end charts

References 

2010 singles
Melodifestivalen songs of 2010
Universal Music Group singles
2009 songs
Swedish-language songs